Napolitan may refer to:

Naporitan or Napolitan, a pasta dish popular in Japan 
Neapolitan (disambiguation), various meanings pertaining to the city or region of Naples (Napoli) in Italy

Persons
Joseph Napolitan (1929–2013), American political consultant

See also
Napoletano (disambiguation)
Napolitano